Tenkasi Lok Sabha constituency is one of the 39 Lok Sabha (parliamentary) constituencies in Tamil Nadu, a state in southern India. It is reserved for SC (Schedule Castes). Its Parliamentary Constituency number is 37.

Assembly segments
Tenkasi Lok Sabha constituency is composed of the following assembly segments :

Before 2009:

1.Sankarankovil (SC)

2.Vasudevanallur (SC)

3.Kadaiyanallur

4.Tenkasi

5.Alangulam

6.Ambasamuthiram

Members of the Parliament

Detailed results

2019

2014

2009

General Election 2004

References

External links
Election Commission of India
Tenkasi lok sabha  constituency election 2019 date and schedule

See also
 Tenkasi
 List of Constituencies of the Lok Sabha

Lok Sabha constituencies in Tamil Nadu
Tirunelveli district